"Nightmare as a Child" is episode 29 of the American television anthology series The Twilight Zone. It originally aired on April 29, 1960 on CBS.

Opening narration

Plot
A school teacher named Helen Foley finds a strange and very serious young girl named Markie on the stairs outside her apartment. The girl seems to know her and tries to jog her memory about a man she saw earlier that day.

The man arrives at Helen's door as Markie, frightened, runs out the back way. The man is Peter Selden, who explains that he worked for Helen's mother when Helen was a child and was the first to find her murdered mother's body. Helen had witnessed the crime but blocked it out. When she mentions Markie, Selden tells her that her nickname was Markie as a child and shows her an old photo of herself. The girl in the photo is identical to the girl Helen met.

When Selden leaves, Helen begins to recollect the night of the murder, and a man rushing toward her after murdering her mother, before running out of the room. Markie then reappears, and tells Helen that she is Helen herself, and that she is there to force her to confront her memory of that night. Selden suddenly returns and confesses to the murder. He tells Helen that her mother had discovered him cooking the books at their workplace, and despite his pleas was going to report him the police. Selden also explains the he had been about to do away with her that night as well, but could not because her screams had drawn people to the apartment. He has been "keeping tabs" on her because he knew one day she would recall the murder. Helen manages to run into the hallway and, after a struggle, pushes Selden down the stairs to his death.

After talking to the police and returning to her apartment, Helen hears a young girl's voice singing the same tune as Markie. To her relief, she doesn't recognize the girl. She tells the girl she has a lovely smile, and to never lose it.

Closing narration

Cast
 Janice Rule as Helen Foley
 Terry Burnham as Markie
 Shepperd Strudwick as Peter Selden
 Michael Fox as Doctor
 Suzanne Cupito (Morgan Brittany) as Little Girl (uncredited)
 Joseph V. Perry as Police Lieutenant

Production notes
Helen Foley was the name of a beloved teacher of Serling's at Binghamton High School, and the main performance theater at that school is named after her. The name Helen Foley is also used for the main character - also a school teacher - in the "It's a Good Life" segment of Twilight Zone: The Movie.

References

Further reading
DeVoe, Bill. (2008). Trivia from The Twilight Zone. Albany, GA: Bear Manor Media. 
Grams, Martin. (2008). The Twilight Zone: Unlocking the Door to a Television Classic. Churchville, MD: OTR Publishing.

External links

Episode summary

1960 American television episodes
The Twilight Zone (1959 TV series season 1) episodes
Television episodes written by Rod Serling